Yuri Stepanov or Yuriy Stepanov may refer to:

Yuri Stepanov (actor) (1967–2010), Russian actor
Yuri Stepanov, actor in the 1997 film The Jackal
Yuri Stepanov (athlete) (1932–1963), Russian high jumper